Mordecai "Max" Hecker (מקס הקר) was an Austrian-born Israeli President of the Technion – Israel Institute of Technology.

Biography
Hecker was born in Austria, and was a civil engineer. He was the President of the Technion – Israel Institute of Technology from 1925 to 1927, succeeding Arthur Blok.

References 

Austrian emigrants to Mandatory Palestine
Academic staff of Technion – Israel Institute of Technology
Technion – Israel Institute of Technology presidents
Austrian civil engineers
Israeli people of Austrian-Jewish descent
1879 births
1964 deaths
Place of death missing